Pseudaltha eboris is a species of moth of the family Limacodidae. It is found in northern Thailand (Chiang Mai) on an altitude of 1,820 meters.

The wingspan is about 26 mm. The body is white. The forewings are also white, with medial and apical black strokes and also a blackish streak between the apical spot and the costa. There are sparse brown scales on the apex of the abdomen. Adults have been recorded in early June.

Etymology
The species name is derived from Latin ebur (meaning ivory, elephant tusk) because of its coloration.

References

Limacodidae
Moths of Asia
Moths described in 2009